Leonid Borisovich Gerchikov (born 17 August 2001) is a Russian football player who plays for Veles Moscow on loan from PFC Krylia Sovetov Samara.

Club career
He made his debut in the Russian Professional Football League for FC Chertanovo Moscow on 20 May 2018 in a game against FC Murom. He made his Russian Football National League debut for Chertanovo on 13 October 2018 in a game against FC Shinnik Yaroslavl.

On 5 February 2022, Gerchikov moved to Krylia Sovetov Samara. On 17 February 2022, Gerchikov was loaned by FC Metallurg Lipetsk.

References

External links
 Profile by Russian Professional Football League

2001 births
Footballers from Moscow
Living people
Russian footballers
Russia youth international footballers
Association football midfielders
FC Chertanovo Moscow players
FC Olimp-Dolgoprudny players
PFC Krylia Sovetov Samara players
FC Metallurg Lipetsk players
FC Veles Moscow players
Russian First League players
Russian Second League players